The Shomrim Societies are fraternal organizations of Jewish members of police departments, such as the New York City Police Department and the Chicago Police Department.

NYPD Shomrim 
The first Shomrim Society was established in the New York City Police Department in 1924. Then Lieutenant Jacob Kaminsky was the Shomrim's first president, and the society was announced by Dr. Isidore Frank, the Jewish chaplain of the NYPD. The society was formed with the permission of then Police Commissioner Richard Enright. It is rumored that a comment made to a young Kaminski, while on patrol, was the spark that started this fraternal and charitable organization. It was suggested that he might feel more at home with a salami, rather than a nightstick, under his arm. At that time only 1% of the department was Jewish.

Shomrim blossomed in New York during the depression years. Civil service jobs provided the only secure means of making a living in those days. The civil service lists of 1935-37 added 400 new Shomrim members. One of Shomrim's early presidents, Max Finkelstein, became famous in 1938 when he was selected by New York Mayor Fiorello H. La Guardia to oversee security for visiting officials from Nazi Germany and to guard the German consulate.

Today, Shomrim Society members hold many different positions in the NYPD, including almost every rank. The highest ranking uniformed female police officer is a three star chief and she is also the current highest-ranking member of the Shomrim Society.

The goal of the society appears atop its stationery "so that Law Enforcement Officers of the Jewish faith may join together for the Welfare of all."

Notes

External links 
NYPD Shomrim Society
 

Jewish clubs and societies
New York City Police Department
Ethnic fraternal orders in the United States
Law enforcement non-governmental organizations in the United States
1924 establishments in New York City